Leinesfjord Chapel is a chapel of the Church of Norway in Steigen Municipality in Nordland county, Norway. It is located in the village of Leinesfjorden. It is an annex chapel in the Leiranger parish which is part of the Salten prosti (deanery) in the Diocese of Sør-Hålogaland. The white, wooden chapel was built in a long church style in 1912 using plans drawn up by the architects Hans Willumsen, Odd Møland, and Weugel Knudsen. The chapel seats about 150 people. It was originally built as a bedehuskapell, but on 26 May 1963, the building was "upgraded" to a full chapel when it was consecrated  by the Bishop Hans Edvard Wisløff. Steigen Municipality owned and operated the chapel until 2004 when the parish congregation took over.

See also
List of churches in Sør-Hålogaland

References

Steigen
Churches in Nordland
Wooden churches in Norway
20th-century Church of Norway church buildings
Churches completed in 1912
1912 establishments in Norway
Long churches in Norway